The Intercon LARP conventions are a series of live action role-playing (LARP) conventions licensed by LARPA and produced by independent groups.  The conventions began with the SiliCon LARP convention, organized in 1986.  To be licensed by LARPA Intercons must support some sort of open bid process in which local groups or individuals, regardless of affiliation, are invited to submit LARP events, and evaluated by some reasonably fair process.

The Intercon Conventions have used the names Silicon, and Intercon. They have been, over the years, a core element of the growth of Theatre Style LARP in the northeastern United States, primarily in the Boston and Washington DC areas. Currently InterCon is held in Warwick, Rhode Island. 

In 2013 the  Wyrd Con Companion Book 2012 was launched at Intercon M.

Events  

SiLicon I Woburn, Massachusetts (Mar. 1986)
SiLicon II Danvers, Massachusetts (Mar. 1987)
SiLicon 2.5 New Jersey (Nov. 1987) (Unofficial event)
SiLicon III Danvers, Massachusetts	(Mar. 1988)
SiLicon 3.5 Morristown, New Jersey (Oct. 1988) (Unofficial event)
SiLicon IV Philadelphia, Pennsylvania	(Apr. 1989)
SiLicon V New Haven, Connecticut (Apr. 1990)
SiLicon VI Annapolis, Maryland (Mar. 1991)
Intercon VII Edison, New Jersey (Mar. 1992)
Intercon 7.5 (Dec. 1992)
Intercon VIII Hunt Valley, Maryland (Mar. 1993)
Intercon IX (Mar. 1994)
Intercon 9.5 Hunt Valley, Maryland (Oct. 1994)
Intercon X Ocean City, Maryland	(Mar. 1995)
Intercon 10.5 Timonium, Maryland (Oct. 1995)
Intercon XI Timonium, Maryland (Mar. 1996)
Intercon 11.5 Mt. Laurel, New Jersey (Oct. 1996)
Intercon XII Hunt Valley, Maryland (Mar. 1997)
Intercon 12.5 Edison, New Jersey (Oct. 1997)
Intercon XIII Natick, Massachusetts (Mar. 1998)
Intercon 13.5 Timonium, Maryland (Oct. 1998)
Intercon XIV Natick, Massachusetts (Mar. 1999)
Intercon 14.5 Cherry Hill, New Jersey (Jul. 1999)
Intercon Millennium Timonium, Maryland (Dec. 1999 - Jan. 2000)
Intercon XV Chelmsford, Massachusetts (Mar. 2000)
Intercon 15.5 Timonium, Maryland (Jun. - Jul. 2000)
Intercon A Chelmsford, Massachusetts (Mar. 2001)
Intercon XVI Timonium, Maryland (Oct. 2001)
Intercon B Chelmsford, Massachusetts (Mar. 2002)
Intercon XVII Timonium, Maryland (Oct. 2002)
Intercon C Chelmsford, Massachusetts (Feb. - Mar. 2003)
Intercon Gazebo (Intercon XVIII) Piscataway, New Jersey (Jul. 2003)
Intercon D Chelmsford, Massachusetts (Mar. 2004)
Intercon Mid-Atlantic 2004 Timonium, Maryland (Oct. 2004)
Intercon E Chelmsford, Massachusetts (Mar. 2005)
Intercon Mid-Atlantic 2005 (Intercon XX) New Castle, Delaware (Oct. 2005)
Intercon F Chelmsford, Massachusetts (Mar. 2006)
Intercon Mid-Atlantic 2006 (Intercon XXI) Rehoboth, Delaware (Nov. 2006)
Intercon G Chelmsford, Massachusetts (Mar. 2007)
Intercon Mid-Atlantic 2007 (Intercon XXII) Rehoboth, Delaware (Nov. 2007)
Intercon H Chelmsford, Massachusetts (Feb. - Mar. 2008)
Intercon Mid-Atlantic 2008 (Intercon XXIII) Rehoboth, Delaware (Nov. 2008)
Intercon I Chelmsford, Massachusetts (Mar. 2009)
Intercon Mid-Atlantic 2009 (Intercon XXIV) Germantown, Maryland (Oct. 2009)
Intercon J Chelmsford, Massachusetts (Mar. 2010)
Intercon K Waltham, Massachusetts (Mar. 2011)
Intercon Mid-Atlantic 2011 Bethesda, Maryland (Sep. 2011)
Intercon L Chelmsford, Massachusetts (Mar. 2012)
Intercon M Chelmsford, Massachusetts (Mar. 2013)
Intercon N Chelmsford, Massachusetts (Feb. - Mar. 2014)
Intercon O Chelmsford, Massachusetts (Feb. - Mar. 2015)
Intercon P Westborough, Massachusetts (Feb. 2016)
Intercon Q Warwick, Rhode Island (Feb. 2017)
Intercon R Warwick, Rhode Island (Feb. 2018)
Intercon S Warwick, Rhode Island (Feb. 2019)
Intercon T Warwick, Rhode Island (Feb - Mar. 2020)
Intercon U Warwick, Rhode Island (Mar. 2023)

External links 
The Current Intercon Website (redirects automatically each year to the current site)
Intercon convention list for New England.

References

Live-action role-playing games
Gaming conventions